PIAS Recordings (formerly Play It Again Sam) is a Belgian record label founded in 1983 by Kenny Gates and Michel Lambot. Play It Again Sam expanded along with other European independent labels in the early 1980s. Play It Again Sam's prominent early artists were electronic-rock acts like Front 242, Meat Beat Manifesto and The Young Gods. They later added artists such as The Sound, Soulwax/2ManyDJ's, Sigur Rós and Mogwai.

History
The first release on the label in 1984 was the mini album Faces in the Fire by the cult experimental psychedelic band The Legendary Pink Dots. This was immediately followed by the 'Four Your Ears Only' EP, an aural map of Northern England, featuring Red Lorry Yellow Lorry, Red Guitars, Party Day and Luddites. This laid the ground for releases from many other artists with very diverse musical backgrounds and geographical origins, including the Butthole Surfers, Parade Ground, The Neon Judgement, The Sound, Skinny Puppy, Taxi Girl, Bill Pritchard and The Cassandra Complex. In 1988 the label released the album Front By Front by Front 242 including the single "Headhunter" (with a video directed by Anton Corbijn).

In 1999, Play It Again Sam signed a German distribution deal with London-based indie dance label Mo' Wax, including works by DJ Shadow and DJ Krush.

In 2000, the label moved from Brussels to London and was renamed PIAS Recordings. PIAS Recordings released the first two albums by Icelandic band Sigur Rós. The Scottish band Mogwai signed to PIAS in 2001.

PIAS announced at the end of 2010 that it would be re-launching Play It Again Sam as a label.

In November 2022, Universal Music Group purchased 49% stake in [PIAS] (including [PIAS] Recordings).

Current roster 

Agnes Obel
Andy Burrows
Arcane Roots
Balthazar
Black M
Blanche
Bohren & der Club of Gore
Brodka
Courting
Champs
Day Wave
Dead Can Dance
dEUS
Editors
Elliot Moss
Failure
Fews
Foxes
Ghostpoet
Harper Simon
Jean-Louis Murat
Jesswar
The Jezabels
Keaton Henson
Joan As Police Woman
Lisa Mitchell
Lord Huron
Lucius
Lykke Li
Mew
Minor Victories
Other Lives
Pixies
Public Service Broadcasting
Salvatore Adamo
The Slow Show
Soap&Skin
Soulwax
Twin Wild
Wave Racer
White Lies

Former artists 

Band of Skulls
Causes
Cabaret Voltaire
Crystal Castles
Enter Shikari
The Darkness
Dinosaur Jr.
Drive-By Truckers
I Am Kloot
The Jim Jones Revue
Jurassic 5
Maxïmo Park
The Middle East
Mogwai
My Morning Jacket
My Vitriol
The Pains of Being Pure at Heart
Placebo
Rodrigo y Gabriela
Seasick Steve
Texas
Young Guns
Zulu Winter

See also 
 PIAS Group

References

External links
 Play It Again, Sam
 PIAS site

IFPI members
British record labels
Belgian independent record labels
Record labels established in 1983
Rock record labels